Henry Eckford was a small passenger-cargo steamboat built in New York in 1824. She was the first steam vessel in the world to be installed with a compound engine, almost fifty years before the technology would become widely adopted for marine use.

Construction

Henry Eckford, named in honor of the renowned New York shipbuilder of the era, was built for Mowatt Brothers & Co. by Lawrence & Sneden of Manhattan, New York, in 1824. The machinery for the vessel was subcontracted to the Allaire Iron Works of James P. Allaire, who installed a compound engine (commonly known at the time as a "Woolf double cylinder" engine). Although the compound engine with its greater efficiency was already a well established technology, having been patented by British inventor Arthur Woolf almost twenty years earlier, such an engine had never before been used to power a ship. 

Henry Eckford's compound engine was of the vertical crosshead type. It had two cylinders—a high-pressure cylinder 12 inches in diameter and a 24 inch low-pressure cylinder—and a stroke of 4 feet.

While the higher pressure was necessary for the compound engine to fully utilize its greater efficiency, it may account for the fact that this type of engine remained unpopular in marine applications long after its invention, as boiler explosions were not uncommon on early steamboats and higher pressures made for more violent explosions. After Henry Eckford, Allaire would go on to install several more steamboats with compound engines, decades before the technology was to achieve widespread acceptance in marine applications.

Service history

Henry Eckford was initially employed as a passenger-and-freight steamer, running on the Hudson River between Rector St., North River, New York City and Albany, New York. The price of a full ticket was $3, with intermediate stops charged in proportion to distance travelled.

In 1825, the Mowatts decided to try using the boat to tow barges. Since no steamboat had previously been utilized in such a role, the proposal was widely greeted with scepticism, but in the first attempt, Henry Eckford pulled two barges from New York to Albany in 24 hours, a commercially viable time. The principle having been established, other steamboat owners quickly followed suit, and steam towboats soon became a commonplace. Henry Eckford herself would thereafter spend much of her career as a towboat. However, she also continued to carry passengers, and in 1826 the steamer's cabin was converted to passenger accommodation. By this time, the fare from New York to Albany had dropped to a dollar.

In the 1830s, Henry Eckford was placed on the route between New York and Norwich, Connecticut. Eventually superseded by newer, faster steamboats, Henry Eckford spent her later years as a towboat in New York Harbor.

Boiler explosion

On April 27, 1841, while getting up steam in dock at the foot of Cedar St., New York, to tow a canal boat, Henry Eckford suffered a boiler explosion. The two  x 30 inch (5.8 by 0.76 m) wrought-iron boilers, with an aggregate weight of about 4 tons, were thrown  toward the stern, wrecking the engine in their path, parts of which were thrown an additional twenty feet. The ship's engineer and firemen were hurled from the vessel by the force of the blast but escaped serious injury; however, a worker on board the canal boat, which was in the process of being secured to the steamer, was killed by a piece of flying metal.

In the subsequent inquest, no blame was attributed to any party, though a tardy government inspection was considered a possible contributing factor. The boiler had reached only about  when the blast occurred, well below its normal operating pressure. Cause of the explosion was determined to be extreme internal corrosion, which in some places had reduced the boiler plates to a fraction of their original  thickness. The boilers had been installed 11 years prior and had an expected lifespan of approximately 15 years.

After the explosion, Henry Eckford's wrecked machinery was removed and the hull was converted into a coal barge, which was still in service as late as 1851. The barge was eventually broken up.

Footnotes

References

Bibliography  
Dwight, Theodore (1825): The Northern Traveller: Containing the Routes to Niagara, Quebec, and the Springs; with Descriptions of the Principal Scenes, and Useful Hints to Strangers, Wilder and Campbell, p. 191.
Haswell, Charles H. (1896): Reminiscences of New York By an Octogenarian (1816–1860), Harper & Brothers, New York. 
Jones, Thomas P. (ed.) (1841): Journal of the Franklin Institute, Third Series, Volume II, Franklin Institute, Philadelphia.
Marine Engineering, Volume IV, July to December 1899, Aldritch and Donaldson, New York.
Morrison, John Harrison (1903): History Of American Steam Navigation, W. F. Sametz & Co., New York. Reprinted in 2008 by READ BOOKS, 
Munsell, J. (1855): The Annals of Albany, J. Munsell, Albany, p. 39.
Spears, John R. (1910): The Story of the American Merchant Marine, The MacMillan Company, New York, p. 166.
Thurston, Robert H. (1883): A History of the Growth of the Steam Engine, Kegan Paul, Trench & Co., London, pp. 282–283.
Thurston, Robert H. (1891): Robert Fulton: His Life and its Results, Dodd, Mean and Company, New York, p. 158.

1824 ships
Ships built in New York City
Steamboats of the Hudson River
Steamboats of Long Island Sound
Passenger ships of the United States
Merchant ships of the United States
Maritime boiler explosions